Edwin Charles Cox CVO CBE TD (3 January 1868  9 December 1958) was a British soldier and railway manager.

He was Traffic Manager, of the Southern Railway from 1930–1936.

He was also a Lt Col. in the Engineer and Railway Staff Corps.

He was appointed CBE in 1918, MVO in 1926 and promoted to CVO in 1937.

References 

Commanders of the Royal Victorian Order
Commanders of the Order of the British Empire
1868 births
1958 deaths